Hezb-e Wahdat-e Islami Afghanistan ("the Islamic Unity Party of Afghanistan"), shortened to Hezbe Wahdat ("the Unity Party"), is an Afghan political party founded in 1989. Like most contemporary major political parties in Afghanistan, Hezb-e Wahdat is rooted in the turbulent period of the anti-Soviet resistance movements in Afghanistan in the 1980s. It was formed to bring together nine separate and mostly inimical military and ideological groups into a single entity.

During the period of the Afghan Civil War in the early 1990s, it emerged as one of the major actors in Kabul and some other parts of the country. Political Islamism was the ideology of most of its key leaders, but the party gradually tilted towards its Hazara ethnic support base and became the key vehicle of the community's political demands and aspirations. Its ideological background and ethnic support base has continuously shaped its character and political agenda. Through the anti-Soviet jihad and the civil war, Hezb-e Wahdat accumulated significant political capital among Afghanistan's Hazaras.

By 2009, however, Hezb-e Wahdat was so fragmented and divided that the political weight it carried in the country bore little resemblance to what it had once been. It had fragmented into at least four competing organizations, each claiming ownership of the name and legacy of Hezb-e Wahdat.

Background

Following the collapse of the pro-Soviet Kabul government in the Hazarajat in 1979, the region fell under the control of Shura-i Engelab, a hastily assembled region-wide organization  Soon it was challenged and overthrown by several new radical Islamist groups that engaged in endless power and ideological struggles, however, these were nonviolent and the various groups were still targeting the USSR forces in unity. The wars and conflicts were launched and fought against the USSR forces with strong ideological fervor. However, none of the organizations were able to determine the outcome of the political control of Hazarajat in their favor. Towards the second half of the 1980s a complete stalemate was emerging in the region, with each organization confined to specific pockets of territory. As a result, there was an overwhelming desire for change felt both by the villagers and senior leaders of the organizations to unite.

Several attempts to make peace and ensure stability failed. Alliances and coalitions were crafted and dismantled. The most important and effective of them were the Shuray-e Eatelaf, an alliance of eight major organizations formed in Tehran, Iran in 1985. It was the most effective attempt to achieve unity of action by the leaderships of the organizations and was to become an important precedent for the formation of Hizb-e Wahdat. However, while the alliance provided the Hazara mujahedin with a common political voice in negotiations and bargaining with the Sunni organizations based in Peshawar, Pakistan, it failed to tackle the incessant ideological friction within the party. To stabilize the region a more radical move was required.

With the announcement of the Soviet withdrawal in January 1988, the collapse of the Kabul government was believed to be imminent and a dramatic reconfiguration of political alignments was in the making. This was happening at a time when the Kabul government and the ruling Hezb-e Democratic-e Khalq (People's Democratic Party, PDPA) were experiencing intensive factional and ethnic rivalries. Declining faith in the future of the government facilitated the emergence of new political alignments largely between members of the same ethnic groups, cutting across the ideological divide between the mujahedin and the PDPA officials. In the meantime, negotiations on the formation of an interim government led by the Sunni organizations based in Peshawar excluded the Hazara alliance based in Tehran. The combined effect of these developments among the Hazara organizations was greater awareness of the need for more collective and assertive bargaining with their Sunni counterparts if they were to be taken seriously. It was against this background that a more radical demand for unification and merger of all existing political-military organizations into a single party dominated the politics of the region. Several meetings were held throughout the region in which the nature and composition of the new party and the role of existing organizations in it were debated extensively. In August 1988, the provincial center of Bamyan fell into the hand of Hazara mujahideen. This further facilitated and encouraged the formation of a regional organization. The operation that resulted in the collapse of the government in the town was coordinated jointly by different mujahidin forces in the region. Salzman-e Nasr (Victory Organization) played a central and coordinating role in the attack. This development marked complete the elimination of any presence of the Kabul government within the entire Hazarajat region 

Henceforth Bamyan was the center of important political developments. It injected a new stimulus into the ongoing unification process among the mujahedin organizations in the region. The town hosted the final meeting that resulted in the declaration of the Misaq-e Wahdat or the unity treaty in July 1989 less than a year after its liberation. It became a center of political leadership and power for the new party beyond and away from the local factional and personal rivalries of local commanders. What contrasted the negotiation process for the formation of Wahdat with similar previous efforts was that it was essentially a process initiated from within the Hazarajat region. The process was informed and shaped by the realities of war, factionalism, and loss of control of the political leadership over military commanders within the region. Conversely, the previous coalition-building efforts were centered in Iran and were often under the direct influence of the Iranian authorities. Once it was formed, its leaders faced the challenge of convincing their representatives at the Shuray-e Eatelaf and officials of the Iranian government, who were more at ease with dealing with a coalition of separate parties in Tehran. The fragmentation of the Hazara mujahedin had given the Iranians effective leverage to control small organizations, often tied to various religious authorities and government agencies in Iran. The Iranians feared that a single party based inside Afghanistan could mean they would lose control over the movement. Furthermore, the increasingly evident ethnic discourse within the party was seen unfavorably by the Iranian authorities who had for years tried to promote a more pan-Shiite political Islamism during the period of jihad. Husain Ibrahimi, the representative of the Iranian supreme leader Ali Khamenei in Afghan affairs at that time, is alleged to have tried to prevent the formation of Hizb-e Wahdat in order to maintain his influence. Eventually, once the party was formed, the Iranians decided to work with it and supported it in the early days of its existence. But, as the subsequent course of political developments (discussed below) shows, the party was to pursue a rather independent political strategy, often in conflict with Iranian policies and interests in the country.

Hezbe Wahdat
As the name Wahdat (Unity) indicates, the main objective of the party was to unify all Shiite mujahedin organizations under a single political leadership. It was created in response to a strong urge for unity among the Hazara leaders as well as commoners.

In its organizational hierarchy, the party included the following key structures:

Shuray-e Aali Nezarat, (the Supreme Supervisory Council), was meant to include high-ranking religious figures and experts. In its supervisory role, the council was tasked to monitor all levels of the party and serve as the highest leadership and control mechanism over all activities and policies of the party.
The next and most important body within the party was its Central Council. This organ was the most powerful deliberative and decision-making authority within the party. Because of the importance attached to it, its membership expanded in a most dramatic manner. Originally, it was planned to include 36 members, but the growing need for expansion and inclusion of other figures and groups into the party resulted in a constant increase in size. The first congress of the party in September 1991 urged the party leadership to facilitate integration of other Shiite groups and figures into the party. As such it was also resolved that the central and supervisory councils could be expanded as needed. At its peak, the Central Council included more than 80 members representing nearly all religious and political groups and influential figures in the region, as well as Hazara figures from the cities. It was through membership and division of power within this council that the party managed to hold the previously fragmented and hostile Hazara political groupings together.
The Wahdat Manifesto also provided for the formation of provincial- and district-level councils that would report to their relevant committees at the headquarters in Bamyan.

The search for change and unity was instigated and led in particular by the senior leaders of the two main organizations, Pasdaran and Nasr, which were the most exposed to the threat of deligitimisation as a result of their loss of control over their military commanders. The path to unity had been a painstakingly long and complex process, which experienced repeated setbacks and obstacles, because each party sought to maximize their role in the process. This turned out to be a major contentious issue throughout several rounds of negotiations in the run up to formation of the party. Smaller parties pressed for equal representation of all groups while the more powerful ones demanded greater power and a share of the positions in the unified party. Eventually the latter argument prevailed; Nasr and Pasdaran persuaded other organizations to concede to proportional representation.

Smaller parties were pressured and even intimidated into joining the process. Many groups had no other choice than joining it: the cost of standing outside would have been unbearable. The following two examples provide insight into the complexity of the process. Harakat Islami, led by Shaikh Asif Mohsini, was the main Shiite party that refused to join Wahdat. The party was dominated by non-Hazara Shiites. Initially, the party was represented in a series of negotiations, but Mohsini later declined to sign, having presented a number of conditions to be met. His conditions were interpreted as an unwillingness to join a party in which historical Hazara grievances and political aspirations predominated. Nonetheless, sections of his party joined Hezb-e Wahdat either because the new party was more promising for the political future of the Hazaras or because the pressure to join was so strong that it could not be resisted. The party's core could resist the pressure to join mainly because it was located outside the region. However, it did lose a substantial section of its Hazara following to Hezb-e Wahdat, a fact underlining the growing importance of ethnic identities in the aftermath of jihad in the country.

The military class that had flourished during the civil war posed one of the main obstacles to unification. Nahzat-e Islami is a good example of military commanders refusing to unite in spite of the agreement of their leaders. Its senior leaders participated in the unification process and hosted one of the meetings in their stronghold in the Jaghori district of Ghazni province. However, Wasiq, Nehzat's main military commander in the district, refused to dismantle his military structure and continued to operate under the name of Nahzat. This resulted in a military confrontation with the formerly Nasr commanders who were fighting on behalf of Hezb-e Wahdat. The conflict resulted in the total defeat of Nahzat and other smaller organisations in this district in 1993. As a result, Wahdat in Jaghori and most other parts of Ghazni established itself through the military victory of the former Nasr forces.

One after the other the smaller parties were pressured or coaxed to join the process. In November 1989, the remnant of Behisthi's Shuray-e Ittefaq also joined. His decision to participate in the unification process was a turning point in the development of clerical leadership in the Hazarajat, as it symbolized the recognition of Khomeinist hegemony by important non-Khomeinist elements of the clergy. Behishthi's Shura was different from other organizations. He represented the conservative and non-revolutionary component of the ulema. He was a follower of the Khoei school of thought, a moderate, non-political and conservative line of thinking opposed to Khomeini’s revolutionary Islamism and dominant among Afghan Shiites until the early 1980s. By the time Hezb-e Wahdat was in the making, Beheshti was reduced to leading a small fraction of the Shura in Nawur district of Ghazni.

The ambition to integrate previously hostile organizations into a single party had achieved a great degree of success. Officially, all the previous organizations except Harakat were dissolved and their military structures were dismantled. A relatively stable political order was restored in the areas under its control. However, the party suffered from serious structural problems and ideological differences.

Ideology and ethnicity
Ideologically, most Hezb-e Wahdat leaders were political Islamists. In a way the formation of the party was the culmination of a process of Islamisation of the Hazara anti-Soviet resistance groups in Afghanistan. The process was accompanied by the gradual rise to dominance of the clergy in the political leadership of the region, and in fact it marked the final victory of the clerical Islamists. By unifying under the new name they further consolidated their political dominance. The Wahdat manifesto emphasized the continuation and intensification of efforts for the creation of an Islamic government based on the Quran and Sunnah. It called for further efforts to incorporate all other genuine Shiite groups into the party and to act in solidarity with all Islamic organizations of the Sunnis. The language of the manifesto clearly indicates that Wahdat was to be, at least predominately, a Shiite organization, despite references to solidarity and cooperation with the Sunni organizations. It demanded an equal status for Shiite jurisprudence alongside the Hanafi school, dominant among Sunnis in the country. As a religious party, Hezb-e Wahdat can be credited with an openness and inclusiveness exceptional in a conservative society like Afghanistan. In an exceptional move among the Afghan mujahedin, the party included ten women members in its central council and had devoted an entire committee for women's affairs that was headed by a university-educated Hazara woman.

The main point, however, is that the movement gradually tilted towards its ethnic support base. Subsequent political developments in Kabul exposed the difficulties of establishing an Islamic government in the country. With the fall of the communist regime in Kabul and the failure to form an Islamic government, the warring factions turned to their ethnic and regional support bases. While Islamism remained the officially proclaimed ideology of most groups, ethnic demands and power struggles surfaced as major sources of political mobilization. Wahdat's leaders were endeavoring to strike a balance between ethnicity and religion. The result was an Islamic ideology used to express and further the rights of a historically disadvantaged community; a strong desire for unity of the Hazaras was its main driving force. In fact, ideologically, Nasr's trademark combination of ethnic nationalism and radical Islamism increasingly became the ideology of Wahdat, an ethnic discourse dominated by, and expressed through, an Islamic language.

Abdul Ali Mazari, a former member of Nasr and first secretary general of Wahdat, was the main agent of the explicit transformation of the party into a platform for the rights and political demands of the Hazaras. When he arrived in Kabul in 1992, he further opened the door of the party to Hazaras of all social and ideological backgrounds. A group of former leftists and government bureaucrats joined the inner circle of the party leadership, generating further rifts. This was a real test of political tolerance of the more conservative section of the clergy. While the party was created to unify the predominantly Islamist and clerical organizations, in Kabul it confronted groups of educated Hazaras much larger than had been the case in the provinces; these were also mostly leftist and relatively well organized. The question of whether the party should accept these individuals divided the party leadership. The ulema (Scholars) needed the knowledge and experiences of these educated Hazaras to help the party adjust to an urban political setting. The party suffered from a chronic shortage of members who had benefited from a modern education. Furthermore, most of the clerics had little familiarity with the politics of Kabul. Most of them were educated in religious centers in Iran and Iraq and had mainly engaged in politics in rural Hazarajat. Finally, Wahdat fighters lacked military skills suitable to an urban environment. Despite that, many key figures in the central council opposed the inclusion of the educated Kabulis in the party, viewing them as godless communists. While none of the former leftists were given any position of authority within the party leadership, their strengthening relationship with, and perceived influence on, Abdul Ali Mazari angered the more conservative sections of the party. Most notable in this regard was Muhammad Akbari, who consistently opposed Wahdat's alliance with non-jihadi groups such as General Dostum’s Junbish Milli and the Hazara leftists. On the other hand, the leftists did not seek any official positions within the party ranks. They were mostly concerned with ensuring their personal security and avoiding persecution by the mujahedin.

Political strategy
The idea of building an Islamic government and promoting religious fraternity rapidly ran into difficulties. Hezb-e Wahdat's stance as the representative of the Hazara mujahedin was not welcomed by its Sunni counterparts in Peshawar. Instead, it was effectively excluded from the negotiations around the formation of a mujahedin government in Kabul, which were dominated by the Sunnis. A Hezb-e Wahdat delegation to Peshawar, sent to negotiate a possible inclusion in the process, returned to Bamyan badly disappointed. In a central council meeting in Bamyan, the delegation headed by Abdul Ali Mazari raised the issue of deliberating a new political strategy. Some of the Sunni fundamentalist parties had basically ignored the Shiite claims of any form of effective representation in a future government. In opposition to Hezb-e Wahdat's demand of a quarter share in future power-sharing arrangements, some of the Sunni parties stated that the Shiites did not count as a significant community, deserving to be included in the negotiation process.

Three days of deliberations in the party's central council in Bamyan produced a new strategy: working out an alliance of the country's historically deprived ethnic communities. This new strategy was to be pursued with the military commanders of various communities in the provinces rather than with the leaders in Peshawar. Government officials of various ethnic communities were also contacted to join or support the new alliance. The new strategy was communicated with various political and military players in the country through delegations and representatives. Fifty delegations were dispatched to several parts of the country, including the Panjshir valley and the northern province of Balkh. Members of the delegations were tasked with exploring a common political strategy for collectively bargaining over the rights of minorities in future political arrangements. The delegations to Panjshir and the north of the country reached important agreements with Massoud and the future leaders of the emergent Junbish-e Milli Islami, which underpinned a new political agreement that became known as Paiman-e Jabalu- Seraj, or the Jabalu-seraj agreement named after the area in Parwan province where one of the final negotiations took place in April 1992. Massoud was chosen as head of the new council, Mohammad Mohaqiq from Hezb-e Wahdat as his deputy and General Dostum as commander of its military affairs.

The alliance of Wahdat, Junbesh and Massoud's Shuray-e Nezar, or Supervisory Council, collapsed as they attempted to take control of Kabul. Similarly, the political arrangements among the Sunni mujahedin organisations also fell apart, turning the city into a battleground for the most devastating and atrocious conflicts. Wahdat became an important part of the conflict for nearly three years. This provoked intense internal debates within the party. The questions of external alignments further inflamed the internal tensions. Muhammad Akbari rose as leader of a pro-Massoud camp within the party, challenging the wisdom of Abdul Ali Mazari's refusal to join Burhanuddin Rabbani's and Massoud's government and his participation in an alliance with Hekmatyar, the leader of Hezb-e Islami, who had emerged as the main opposition.

The differences between Abdul Ali Mazari and Akbari resulted in the first major split within the party. After the split, both leaders maintained separate political and military organisations under the name of Wahdat, with Abdul Ali Mazari maintaining the main body of the party. The growing rivalries and tensions between the two leaders surfaced strongly in the preparations for the party's leadership election in September 1994. The election was held amid a heightened competition between the two contending figures for leadership of the party. The party was experiencing its most difficult internal power struggle since it had been formed. New political fault lines were emerging as the party leaders tried to define and articulate their political agendas in Kabul. Both sides were determined to win in order to dominate leadership positions and consequently change the political direction of the party. The venue for the forthcoming elections also proved to be contentious. Akbari was pressing for the elections to be held in Bamyan where he felt stronger. By contrast, Mazari and his supporters pushed for elections in Kabul where he had cultivated a larger support base among urbanised Hazaras. Given the political differences and personal rivalries between the two leaders, the first election of the secretary general of the party was hotly contested. It was also particularly sensitive given the context of the civil war in Kabul, with regards to which both figures were proposing different political directions for the party. Akbari hoped he could alter the role of the party in the war and in the conflict in Kabul in favour of Rabbani's government through his election as secretary general of the party. Consequently, the election of secretary general gained a paramount importance for both sides in the civil war to maintain or change the political alignments of the party in their favour.

The elections were held amid a climate of distrust and violence. By gaining 43 votes (out of 82 members of the central council present), Abdul Ali Mazari was re-elected as leader. Akbari with 33 votes was elected as his first deputy. Similarly, agreements were reached on 20 other key appointments. Akbari's faction won the positions of heads of cultural and military committees, which they had strongly pressed for. He and his supporters believed that by dominating the cultural and military committees they could manipulate the war and propaganda machine of the party in favour of the Rabbani government, their external ally. Karim Khalili, who would later become the leader of the party, was elected as chief of its political affairs committee. The voting patterns during the elections offer important insights into the internal politics of the party. Members of Nasr and Pasdaran, the two largest and most powerful numerically and politically, dominated the process as well as the two emergent factions. While Nasr maintained its cohesiveness, most other smaller organisations were divided. All former members of Nasr in the council voted for Mazari, testifying to the lasting cohesiveness of Nasr as a political block within Wahdat. By contrast, while most former members of Pasdaran supported Akbari, some of them cast their votes for Mazari. For instance, Ali Jan Zahidi, Ghulam Hussain Shafaq, Hayatullah Balaghi and Abdul Ahmed Fayaz, previously important local leaders of Pasdaran, threw their support behind Mazari. Similarly, most former members of Harakat and Nahzat followed Pasdaran, while most of Sazman-e Daawat and Mostazafin supported Mazari. Other organisations such as Shuray-e Ittefaq and Jabh-e Motahid were bitterly divided.

Moreover, distrust and suspicions continued to undermine the new appointments. The role of external players, particularly that of Rabbani's government, was crucial. It is believed that the Rabbani government had been working through their contacts with Akbari to undermine Mazari and turn Hezb-e Wahdat into an ally. Mazari strongly suspected Akbari of trying to undermine him. A few weeks after the party elections, in response to an alleged coup plan by Akbari and sections of Harakat Islami against him, Mazari ordered his troops to attack and expel all his opponents from the western part of the capital. Consequently, Akbari, his supporters and his allies in Harakat were forced to flee into areas controlled by Massoud in the north of the capital. While the exact details of the alleged plot remain unknown, Mazari later claimed that Qasim Fahim, then Rabbani's head of the intelligence department, was working with Akbari to militarily force him out of leadership. According to the allegations, Massoud was funding and arming as many as 20,000 troops to allow Akbari to take over Wahdat's leadership in Kabul and establish its control in Hazarajat as well.

The split opened a deep and long standing political division among the Hazaras of Afghanistan. While Mazari and his successor Khalili commanded the support of most of the Hazaras, Akbari mostly operated in opposition to them. Following the death of Mazari at the hands of the Taliban in March 1995, Karim Khalili was elected as the new party leader. He reorganised the party, re-established control over the Hazarajat region and joined Massoud and Junbesh against the newly emerged Taliban threat in a new alliance called the Supreme Council for Defence of the Motherland, which was later known as the ‘northern alliance’. In contrast, Akbari joined the Taliban when they took control of Bamyan in September 1998.

Hezb e Wahdat (Post-Taliban)
In its history, the party suffered three major defeats. The first defeat was marked by its downfall in Kabul and the death of Mazari at the hands of the Taliban in March 1995. Secondly, in August 1998 the northern city of Mazar-e Sharif was overrun by the Taliban; the city was the second important centre of the northern alliance after the fall of Kabul and also held a major concentration of Wahdat's troops and civilian Hazaras. Hezb-e Wahdat had played the key role in repelling a Taliban offensive on the city in 1997 and was to bear the brunt of Taliban anger this time. Thousands of Hazaras were massacred or imprisoned. Thirdly, in a few weeks the Taliban captured Bamyan, the new headquarters of the party, in another dramatic move. This marked the end of Hezb-e Wahdat's political life as a cohesive political organisation. The fall of these two cities proved to be much more than military defeats. Nearly all of the territories under its control were captured by the Taliban. Its political and military cadres fled into neighbouring countries. Khalili went to Iran. From amongst the senior leaders, only Muhaqiq after a brief period in Iran returned quickly to Afghanistan and organised a resistance front in the Balkhab district of Saripul. Wahdat It never managed to recover after the fall of Mazar e sharif and Bamyan into the hands of the Taliban, because of the high losses in its rank and file and at the leadership levels.

Thus Hezb-e Wahdat participated in the post-Taliban political process with little of its past political and military weight. Wahdat still claimed to represent the Hazaras and the Hazarajat region fell under its control as the Taliban regime was overthrown. In the Interim Administration (2001–2002), Wahdat had a modest weight; Muhammad Mohaqiq represented the party as one of the deputy chairmen and Minister of Planning. Members of Harakat and Akbari's Wahdat mostly represented the Shiites in the Interim Administration as well as the Transitional Administration in 2002-2003. Moreover, in the new political circumstances, the party needed to adapt to the new political realities in the country. The new political order established under the auspices of the international community required the military-political organisations to transform into civilian political parties. This entailed disbanding their military wings, disarming under the UN-led Disarmament, Demobilization and Reintegration programme and operating under the new legal and political environment. As mentioned earlier, Hezb-e Wahdat's military structure disintegrated under the Taliban, and as a result in late 2001 the organisation was in no way comparable to other anti-Taliban organisations in terms of military structure and hardware. Its leaders lacked the political and military resources to reorganise their fighters on any significant scale. In June 2005 the only major military structure controlled by the party, the Ninth Corps, was disbanded, ending financial support from the centre to Wahdat's military wing. Lacking resources and with a weak organisation, the party saw its military activities almost come to a halt; only in northern Afghanistan did some elements of it survive. Wahdat's weakness vis-à-vis other, better resourced military-political organisations was compounded. On the positive side, its leaders can claim credit for effectively having given up their military wing.

The second and most pressing demand for reform came from within the Hazara political community. Reforming and reviving the party as the largest and most influential Hazara organisation was a central priority for most of the Hazara intellectual and clerical elites. Many educated Hazaras of various ideological backgrounds rushed to Kabul in 2002 and volunteered to play a role in the party. Ideas for reform and restructuring the party were presented to Karim Khalili and Muhammad Mohaqiq, who were seen as the key leaders. While the need to change and broaden the party leadership has frequently been acknowledged by both Mohaqiq and Khalili, most reformists (including clerics) have been frustrated by lack of practical will and determination of the senior leaders. With the disintegration of its military structures and the necessity to transform into a full political party, Hezb-e Wahdat faced an extremely difficult challenge that required radical changes. The transition from a military to political organisation has been similarly difficult for other Afghan organisations created during the years of war. But Hizb-e Wahdat faced a unique predicament of its own, deriving from the emergence of a much larger educated class among the Hazaras. Wahdat's political cadres were mostly clerics educated in religious schools in Afghanistan or in Iran and Iraq. In their rise to political leadership they fiercely competed with university-educated challengers and remained sceptical and fearful of modern educated politicians. They suddenly found themselves forced to engage with western notions of democracy, human rights, etcetera. As in 1992, opening the doors of the party to more educated Hazara cadres was a precondition for meeting reformist expectations, but the return to the country of many young Hazaras educated in Iran and Pakistan was out of all proportion with the threat that had been represented by the limited number of leftists and government officials welcomed into Wahdat in 1992. After 2001, the party nominally maintained its old structure in which seven of the eleven commissions within the Jaghori of the party were chaired by ulema. Only technical and insignificant positions such as health and archaeological committees were headed by non-clerical figures. Furthermore, the non-clerical figures were mostly acting on behalf of their senior clerical leaders. But an opening of the party to the growing secular intelligentsia meant that their monopoly over the political leadership of Hazara society risked being undermined.

While a few of Wahdat's founders continued to exercise leadership and political power, most others were not as lucky. The failure to revive party structures left many of them politically marginalised. Second rank officials of Hezb-e Wahdat, such as most members of the central council, have mostly been unable to find a state job. Many of them opted to reside in their home areas in the Hazarajat, far away from leaderships in Kabul.

The Political Fragmentation of Hezb-e Wahdat
The situation of Hezb-e Wahdat in early 2009 and its political fragmentation can best be explained by the leadership style of its leaders. In the immediate aftermath of the fall of the Taliban, Khalili was widely recognised as leader of the party. In April 2002 he flew to Kabul from Bamyan, in a move that shifted the party headquarters to Kabul. He was warmly received by Mohaqiq, who was deputy chair and Planning Minister of the Interim Administration, and other senior figures of the organisation. In the Transitional Administration, Khalili replaced Mohaqiq as a vice-president, becoming the highest Hazara official in the government. Until before the presidential election of 2005, Muhaqiq was at least officially heading the political affairs committee of Hezb-e Wahdat in Kabul. Their relationship, however, soon started unravelling. Apparently, Muhaqiq had adopted a more confrontational approach within the government on the issues of development and reconstruction plans in Hazara areas. It is alleged that his powers as the Minister of Planning were being transferred to the more powerful and assertive finance ministry, under the leadership of the western educated technocrat Ashraf Ghani. Mohaqiq left the cabinet in controversy in 2004. Khalili and Mohaqeq have since engaged in personal rivalry and competition for power within the government as well as for leadership among the Hazaras. Their rivalry came to the fore when Mohaqiq decided to stand as a candidate for presidential elections in 2005 and Khalili ran as the second vice-president with Hamid Karzai. Subsequently, Mohaqiq joined the main opposition alliance, the Understanding Front, led by Yunus Qanuni. By standing in opposition to the government, he championed the rights of Hazaras and continued to undermine Karim Khalili. The personalisation of leadership was not limited to Mohaqiq and Khalili and resulted in the fragmentation of the party into the following four splinter organizations.

1.Hezb-e Wahdat Islami Afghanistan (Karim Khalili)

2.Hezb-e Wahdat Islami Mardum-e Afghanistan (Muhammad Mohaqiq)

3.Hezb-e Wahdat Milli Islami Afghanistan (Muhammad Akbari)

4. Hezb-e Wahdat Islami Millat-e Afghanistan (Qurban Ali Erfani)

Publications
Mosharekat-e Melli Weekly, a weekly magazine

Glossary of Dari (Afghan Persian) words
Most of these terms are loanwords from Arabic.

See also
People's Islamic Unity Party of Afghanistan
National Islamic Unity Party of Afghanistan

References

Hazara political parties
Hezbe Wahdat politicians
Shia Islamic political parties in Afghanistan
Political parties established in 1989
Political parties of minorities
Political parties in Afghanistan